Swampweed may refer to:

 Hygrophila (plant), a plant genus in the family Acanthaceae
 Selliera radicans, a plant species in the family Goodeniaceae
 Swampweed, a fictional plant species inspired by Cannabis which appears in the PC role-playing game Gothic (video game) released in 2001.